Mister Roberts is a 1984 American made-for-television comedy-drama film adapted from the 1948 play by Thomas Heggen and Joshua Logan, based on Heggen's 1946 novel, and starring Robert Hays as Doug Roberts and Charles Durning as the Captain. It was originally broadcast on NBC on March 19, 1984.

Cast
Robert Hays as Lt. JG Doug Roberts  
Kevin Bacon as Ens. Frank Pulver  
Raye Birk as Dowdy  
Charles Durning as The Captain  
Marilu Henner as Nurse Girard  
Howard Hesseman as Doc

External links

1984 television films
1984 films
1984 comedy-drama films
American comedy-drama films
Films based on adaptations
Military humor in film
NBC network original films
Television shows based on American novels
Television shows based on plays
Television remakes of films
Films about the United States Navy in World War II
American drama television films
1980s American films